Martin Dudley Beaumont CVO (born 6 August 1949) is a British businessman who was, until October 2007, the  chief executive of the Co-operative group, today a £9.4 billion turnover enterprise employing in excess of 85,000 people across a diverse portfolio of businesses.

Early life
He attended Magdalene College, Cambridge, where he studied Land Economy.

Career
During his tenure, he continued extensive restructuring and modernisation of the group - which spans food stores, funerals, pharmacies and financial services. In particular, he reshaped the portfolio of businesses, implemented a strategy to rejuvenate the brand and reintroduced the Coop dividend.

From 1992 for ten years he was CEO of United Cooperatives where he grew turnover to £1.3 billion, overseeing the expansion of its trading base and a consistent growth in profits. He was also deputy chairman of The Co-operative Bank. A Cambridge University graduate, Martin Beaumont spent the first 16 years of his career with KPMG, becoming a partner with general practice and management consultancy responsibilities.

Amongst several non-executive and advisory roles, he is chairman of the UK Retail skills council Skillsmart since 2007. He is also Chairman of Chester Races and Kind Consumer

Personal life
He married Andrea Wilberforce in 1976, and they have three daughters.

Beaumont was appointed by Her Majesty The Queen as High Sheriff of Cheshire for the Shrieval Year 2013/2014

He was appointed Commander of the Royal Victorian Order (CVO) in the 2017 Birthday Honours for his services as a member of the Duchy of Lancaster Council.

References

1949 births
Living people
Alumni of Magdalene College, Cambridge
British retail chief executives
Commanders of the Royal Victorian Order
English businesspeople in retailing
High Sheriffs of Cheshire
The Co-operative Group